Šimon Horniak (born 1 March 2001) is a Slovak footballer who plays for Družstevník Veľké Ludince as a defender.

Club career

FK Senica
Horniak was elevated into the first team of Senica amidst the club facing financial issues in the winter of 2019/20 and had released most of their first squad foreign players. He made his professional Fortuna Liga debut for Senica in a home fixture against Spartak Trnava on 23 February 2020. Horniak came on as a stoppage time replacement for Denis Baumgartner with the aim of keeping the two goal lead. Senica won the game 2:0.

References

External links
 FK Senica official club profile 
 Futbalnet profile 
 
 

2001 births
Living people
People from Levice
Sportspeople from the Nitra Region
Slovak footballers
Association football defenders
FK Senica players
TJ Družstevník Veľké Ludince players
Slovak Super Liga players
3. Liga (Slovakia) players